Aarathu Sinam is a 2016 Indian Tamil-language slasher crime thriller film written and directed by Arivazhagan and produced by Sri Thenandal Films. A remake of Jeethu Joseph's Malayalam film Memories (2013), the film stars Arulnithi, Aishwarya Rajesh and Aishwarya Dutta. Featuring music composed by Thaman and cinematography by Aravinnd Singh, the film began production during November 2015 and released in February 2016. Despite a positive critical reception, the film was an average grosser.

Plot
ACP Aravind  was a daredevil police officer who is now off duty due to his drinking habits, which he engaged in after his wife Mia and child Meenu were murdered by criminals who wanted revenge. Aravind's supervisor requests him to proceed with a parallel investigation in a case involving the disappearance and possible kidnapping of several young married men, since the present police team is not able to make any progress in the case. Aravind refuses to this, but later, his mother requests him to. Aravind soon gets into the case files and consults the postmortem documents and the doctors who conducted it.

Soon, Aravind is seen making a breakthrough in the case. Another two kidnappings happen in the series, and all this leads to Aravind's rough conclusion of the murderer. The murderer is an eccentric person, has a limp in his feet, and either hates or loves women. The killer leaves certain clues inscribed by sharp surgical knives on the victims' chests. This serves Aravind's thinking of what kind of person the killer is and who his next target is. Upon careful examination of the words inscribed in the victims' bodies, Aravind uncovers that the words are actually Aramaic, the language that Jesus used for communication. The words are later found to point to biblical proverbs, thus helping Aravind lead to conclusions that the killer is insane and that he assumed the victims gave up their lives for the sins committed by their respective wives. He soon figures out that the wives of the kidnapped husbands have links and they all had to do with a guy who studied with them certain years back. There was absolutely no evidence of such a person.

During all these scenes, Aravind realizes that there is one last target, and the killer will not miss this, and he will disappear after that. He eventually finds out that the next target is his own brother, and his brother's wife is the last link in the connection. Aravind, with the help of his colleague and other evidences, finds out that the killer has a property. The film ends with Aravind using his presence of mind, apprehending the murderer and saving his brother's life. The story of this movie is adapted from Blake Pierce's novel Before He Kills.

Cast

Production
The collaboration of Sri Thenandal Films and Arivazhagan for the remake of Jeethu Joseph's Malayalam film Memories (2013) was first announced in August 2015 and the film began production in October. Titled Aarathu Sinam, the makers signed on Arulnithi to play the lead role and held discussions with actresses Nikki Galrani, Miya and Monal Gajjar, before signing on Aishwarya Rajesh and Aishwarya Dutta to play the lead roles. By late November 2015, the film was revealed to be 90% complete.

Release
The satellite rights of the film were sold to Sun TV.

Soundtrack
The soundtrack has only one song composed by S. Thaman with lyrics by Viveka.

Thanimaye — Vijay Yesudas

Critical reception
Rediff wrote "Director Arivazhagan's Aarathu Sinam is a decent crime thriller with plenty of exciting moments that make it worth a watch." Behindwoods wrote "
All that considered, Arivazhagan's Aarathu Sinam is definitely a progressive Tamil movie that deserves a watch for its sincere attempt at the less explored investigative crime thriller genre. Where Arivazhagan proves to be an effective director is at getting the job perfectly done from his technical team. His visual sense is brilliant and apt to suit the stories he selects" Sify cites "Remaking a Malayalam classic is definitely an arduous task. Memories is one of the finest crime thrillers made in Malayalam cinema and to be honest, Arivazhagan has successfully pulled it off to a very large extend. Overall, Aarathu Sinam is a decent investigation thriller, especially for audiences who haven't seen the original". Baradwaj Rangan of the Hindu wrote "Maybe something got lost in the translation, but there's no mood, no atmosphere, no white-knuckle tension in Aarathu Sinam. There's just plot. And big swatches of explanatory dialogue – people keep talking as though a switch went on, and they just won't stop. It isn't even conversation. It's just information."

References

External links

2016 films
2010s Tamil-language films
Films shot in Madurai
2016 crime thriller films
Films scored by Thaman S
Tamil remakes of Malayalam films
Fictional portrayals of the Tamil Nadu Police
Indian films about revenge
2010s police procedural films
Films about murder
Films about murderers
Indian nonlinear narrative films
Indian serial killer films
2010s serial killer films
Indian detective films
Indian mystery thriller films
Films set in Madurai
Films set in Theni
Indian crime thriller films
2010s mystery thriller films
Films directed by Arivazhagan Venkatachalam